Hit the Lights is a compilation album by British R&B singer Jay Sean. The India tour edition was released in India on 12 August 2011, by Universal Music India and the Japan edition was released in Japan on 18 January 2012 by Cash Money Records. The album features guest appearances from Nicki Minaj, Lil Wayne, Tyga and Birdman.

Track listing

India tour edition
 "Hit the Lights" (featuring Lil Wayne)
 "2012 (It Ain't the End)" (featuring Nicki Minaj)
 "Cry"
 "Where Do We Go"
 "Down" (featuring Lil Wayne)
 "Do You Remember" (featuring Sean Paul & Lil Jon)
 "War (New Version)"
 "If I Ain't Got You"
 "Do You"
 "All or Nothing"
 "Stuck in the Middle" (featuring Craig David)
 "Hit the Lights (7th Heaven Radio Remix)" (featuring Lil Wayne)
 "Hit the Lights (Club Junkies Radio Remix)" (featuring Lil Wayne)

Release history

References

2012 compilation albums
Jay Sean albums
Cash Money Records compilation albums